Pauldingville is an unincorporated community in northwest St. Charles County, in the U.S. state of Missouri. The community is three miles south of Foristell and I-70. Sams Creek flows past approximately one mile to the east.

The namesake of Pauldingville is unknown.

References

Unincorporated communities in St. Charles County, Missouri
Unincorporated communities in Missouri